KBLM-LP was a low-power television station in Riverside and San Bernardino, broadcasting to the Riverside-San Bernardino-Ontario Metropolitan Area on UHF channel 25. Founded August 12, 1999, the station was owned by the Louis Martinez Family Group.

Early programming on the station was independent, although the station had reportedly aired programming from Univision and HSN Español until becoming an affiliate of Mas Musica in 2000.

On September 25, 2006, KBLM-LP switched to the new MTV Tr3́s network (now simply known as Tr3́s since July 2010), which was created as a result of Viacom's acquisition of Mas Musica.

The station went silent in 2016. KBLM-LP's license was cancelled by the Federal Communications Commission on June 1, 2018.

References

External links
MTV Tr3́s

Television channels and stations established in 1999
1999 establishments in California
Defunct television stations in the United States
Television channels and stations disestablished in 2018
2018 disestablishments in California
BLM-LP
BLM-LP